The MapR File System (MapR FS) is a clustered file system that supports both very
large-scale and high-performance uses. MapR FS supports a variety of interfaces including
conventional read/write file access via NFS and a FUSE interface, as well as via the HDFS interface used by
many systems such as Apache Hadoop and Apache Spark. In addition to file-oriented access,
MapR FS supports access to tables and message streams using the Apache HBase and Apache Kafka APIs as well as via a document database interface.

First released in 2010, MapR FS is now typically described as the MapR Converged Data Platform due
to the addition of tabular and messaging interfaces. The same core technology is, however, used to
implement all of these forms of persistent data storage and all of the interfaces are ultimately
supported by the same server processes. To distinguish the different capabilities of the overall
data platform, the term MapR FS is used more specifically to refer to the file-oriented interfaces,
MapR DB or MapR JSON DB is used to refer to the tabular interfaces and MapR Streams is used to
describe the message streaming capabilities.

MapR FS is a cluster filesystem in that it provides uniform access from/to files and other objects
such as tables using a universal namespace accessible from any client of the system. Access control
is also provided for files, tables and streams using access control expressions, which are an
extension of the more common (and limited) access control list to allow permissions to be
composed not just of lists of allowed users or groups, but instead to allow boolean combinations of
user id and groups.

History
MapR FS was developed starting in 2009 by MapR Technologies to extend the capabilities of
Apache Hadoop by providing a more performant and stable platform. The design of MapR FS is
influenced by various other systems such as the Andrew File System (AFS). The concept of
volumes in AFS has some strong similarity from the point of the view of users, although the
implementation in MapR FS is completely different. One major difference between AFS and MapR FS is
that the latter uses a strong consistency model while AFS provides only weak consistency.

To meet the original goals of supporting Hadoop programs, MapR FS supports the HDFS API by
translating HDFS function calls into an internal API based on a custom remote procedure call (RPC) mechanism. The normal write-once model of HDFS is replaced in
MapR FS by a fully mutable file system even when using the HDFS API. The ability to support file
mutation allows the implementation of an NFS server that translates NFS operations into internal
MapR RPC calls. Similar mechanisms are used to allow a Filesystem in Userspace (FUSE) interface
and an approximate emulation of the Apache HBase API.

Architecture
Files in MapR FS are internally implemented by splitting the file contents into chunks,
typically each 256 MB in size although the size is specific to each file. Each chunk is written to
containers which are the element of replication in the cluster. Containers are replicated and
the replication is done by either linear fashion in which each replica forwards write operations to
the next replica in line or in a star fashion in which the master replica forwards write operations
to all other replicas at the same time. Writes are acknowledged by the master replica when all writes
to all replicas complete. Internally, containers implement B-trees which are used at multiple
levels such as to map file offset to chunk within a file or to map file offset to the correct 8kB
block within a chunk.

These B-trees are also used to implement directories. A long hash of each file or directory name in
the directory is used to find the child file or directory table.

A volume is a special data structure similar to a directory in many ways, except that it allows
additional access control and management operations. A notable capability of volumes is that the
nodes on which a volume may reside within a cluster can be restricted to control performance,
particularly in heavily contended multi-tenant systems that are running a wide variety of
workloads.

Proprietary technology is used in MapR FS to implement transactions in containers and to achieve
consistent crash recovery.

Other features of the filesystem include:
 Distributed cluster metadata, including the location of all containers and their arrangement into replication chains.
 Distributed metadata, including the directory tree. All directories are fully replicated and no single node contains all of the meta-data for the cluster.
 Efficient use of B-trees to achieve high performance even with very large directories.
 Partition tolerance. A cluster can be partitioned without loss of consistency, although availability may be compromised. Restricted consistency replication across multiple clusters is also supported using volume mirrors, and near real-time replication of tables and streams.
 Consistent multi-threaded update. Files can be updated or read by very many threads of control simultaneously without requiring global locking structures.
 Rolling upgrades and online filesystem maintenance. Almost all maintenance including major version upgrades can be performed while the cluster continues to operate at nearly full speed.

See also
 GFS2
 Gluster
 Google File System
 List of file systems
 Lustre (file system)
 MooseFS
 OCFS2
 QFS
 RozoFS
 Shared disk file system
 ZFS

References

External links
 MapR home page

Distributed file systems supported by the Linux kernel
Distributed file systems